ToonBox Entertainment is a Canadian animation studio, founded in June 2008, and is best known for its 2014 animated feature and its first film, The Nut Job.

Filmography

Feature films

Released films

Television series

References

External links
 

Canadian animation studios
Mass media companies established in 2008
Companies based in Toronto
Canadian companies established in 2008
2008 establishments in Ontario